Maddila Gurumoorthy (born 22 June 1985) is an Indian politician from YSR Congress Party. He was elected as MP in 2021 by-polls from Tirupati Andhra Pradesh, India. The bye-election, held on 17 April following the death of sitting MP YSRCP's Balli Durga Prasad Rao in September 2020.

Electoral performance 
He won the 2021 By Poll on Former Union Minister Panabaka Lakhmi of TDP being a YSR Congress Party candidate. He won the election with a thumping majority of 2,71,592 votes against his closest rival Panabaka Lakshmi of Telugu Desam Party.

First term 2021–2024 
He began his first term as a Member of Parliament on 2 May 2021. His individual attendance at the Parliament is 91%.

By Poll 2021

References

Living people
1985 births
Telugu politicians
India MPs 2019–present
Lok Sabha members from Andhra Pradesh
YSR Congress Party politicians
Tirupati
Indian politicians